Mirabeau B. Lamar High School is a secondary school in Arlington, Texas. It is named for Mirabeau B. Lamar, the second president of the Republic of Texas, and serves grades 9 through 12 in the Arlington Independent School District.

History
Lamar opened in 1970 as Arlington Independent School District's third high school. Lamar relieved Arlington High School and Sam Houston High School. Cathy Brown of The Dallas Morning News said that Lamar's effect on Sam Houston was "minimal" because there were very few housing units located north of Division and east of Collins. Brown said that "[t]he effect on Arlington High School was huge" since the housing in the Arlington zone north to Division had been moved to Lamar. 12th grade students that had been zoned out of Arlington High School continued to attend Arlington High School, despite being in the Lamar zone.

In 1982, Martin High School opened. Brown said that Sam Houston and Lamar were "relatively unaffected" by the opening of Martin, located in southwest Arlington.

Feeder patterns 
Ellis, Jones, Larson, Peach, Roquemore, Sherrod, and Webb Elementaries feed into Nichols Jr. High. Butler, Pope, Speer, and Wimbish Elementaries feed into Shackelford Jr. High. Nichols and Shackelford Jr. Highs feed into Lamar.

Notable alumni
Corinne Bohrer: film and television actress
Sean Lowe: Former Bachelor and television personality
Taylor Cole: Actress, Summerland and numerous other shows
Corby Davidson: Radio Personality, KTCK 1310 The Ticket
James Duff: Creator, executive director and head writer of TNT's The Closer
Fred Jackson: Buffalo Bills running back
Lauren Lane: Actress, The Nanny and other productions
Scott McGarrahan: Former NFL defensive back (1998–2005) for Green Bay Packers, Miami Dolphins, Tennessee Titans, San Diego Chargers and Detroit Lions
Jeremy Wariner: Gold medalist in 400 meters and 4x400 relay at 2004 Summer Olympics, silver medalist in 400 meters and gold medalist in 4x400 relay at 2008 Summer Olympics
Mitch Willis: Former NFL defensive lineman (1985–90) for Oakland Raiders, Atlanta Falcons and Dallas Cowboys; played collegiately at SMU
Billy Miller: Actor, The Young and the Restless and All My Children; 2010 Daytime Emmy award winner, Outstanding Supporting Actor in a Drama Series.
Mark M. Shelton: Texas House of Representatives District 97 (2009-2013), physician at Cook Children's Hospital
John Rayborn: Former UTEP Quarterback, playing in Canadian Football League and Arena Football League.
Shane Buechele: Quarterback for the Kansas City Chiefs
Perry Minasian: General Manager, Los Angeles Angels, MLB
Bobby Brown III: NFL defensive lineman, currently with the Los Angeles Rams
Kyron Johnson: Linebacker for the Philadelphia Eagles

References

External links

 Lamar High School
 Arlington Independent School District

Arlington Independent School District high schools
High schools in Arlington, Texas
1970 establishments in Texas
International Baccalaureate schools in Texas
Educational institutions established in 1970